W. Joseph Fuller House is an historic residence located in Muscatine, Iowa, United States.   It has been listed on the National Register of Historic Places since 1982.

History
Four Fuller brothers, German immigrants, were already living in Muscatine in 1837.  One of them, Henry, was a brick maker.  He had six children and his sons Joseph and Anthony followed him in the brick making business.   Joseph bought this lot in 1877 and had the house built the following year.  He lived here until at least 1892.  City directories from the late 19th-century also list this as the location of his pottery manufacturing business.

Architecture
The house is a vernacular interpretation of the Italianate style.  While it is similar in size and age with other houses in the neighborhood, its brick exterior distinguishes it from the frame houses that surround it.  The exterior is a soft brick that is painted.  The structure is a hipped roof box, and features large round-arched windows. The round arches are composed of brick with stone keystones. Large brackets with pendants band the cornice at the roof line of the two-story structure.

References

Houses completed in 1878
Italianate architecture in Iowa
Buildings and structures in Muscatine, Iowa
Houses in Muscatine County, Iowa
National Register of Historic Places in Muscatine County, Iowa
Houses on the National Register of Historic Places in Iowa